Tomé Osvaldo Alberto Pedro (born 22 July 1998), commonly known as Tomé, is an Angolan footballer who currently plays as a defender for Mar Menor.

Career statistics

Club

Notes

International

References

1998 births
Living people
Angolan footballers
Angola international footballers
Association football defenders
Atlético Petróleos de Luanda players
Tercera División players
Angolan expatriate footballers
Angolan expatriate sportspeople in Spain
Expatriate footballers in Spain
People from Luanda
Mar Menor FC players